Dance Contest may refer to:

 "Dance Contest", a 2007 episode of Drake & Josh
 "Dance Contest", a 2007 episode of Zoey 101
 Eurovision Dance Contest, an international ballroom dancing competition